Robert Paul "Robbie" Ryan (born 16 May 1977 in Dublin) is an Irish retired footballer, who was a left back. Ryan now works as a cable linesman for London Underground.

Career
Ryan played his youth football for Belvedere. Ryan began his senior career at Huddersfield Town in July 1994 but did not make his first team debut until September 1996 when he came on as a sub in a 3–1 win over Ipswich Town.

After making just 15 Appearances for The Terriers, Ryan joined Millwall in 2000, costing the club £10,000. He made his debut in a 0–0 draw with Southend United. In the 2000–01 season he only missed four games for Millwall as they won the Football League Second Division title. The following season, Ryan played 32 league games as Millwall made the First Division play-offs, losing to Birmingham City.

At the end of his contract, Millwall offered him another one-year deal, which he declined in favour of a three-year deal with Bristol Rovers, despite dropping down two divisions. He had played 226 league games for Millwall. His last appearance in a Millwall shirt happened to be the 2004 FA Cup Final against Manchester United where he was marking Cristiano Ronaldo.	

Computer game Championship Manager played its part in Ryan's transfer. Utilising real-life statistical data, the game revealed to Ryan Molesworth, the son of Bristol Rovers scout Paul Molesworth, that Robbie Ryan's contract was expiring. Rovers then became interested in signing the player, which after negotiations, actually took place.

In the 2004–05 season, Ryan made 40 league appearances for Bristol Rovers. In 2005–06 he played only 17 games, none at all since November. On 1 February 2007 Bristol Rovers terminated Ryan's contract.

Ryan has represented the Republic of Ireland at schoolboy and youth levels playing in the 1997 FIFA World Youth Championship in Malaysia for the Republic of Ireland who came 3rd and has also picked up 12 U21 caps.

Honours
Millwall
Football League Second Division: 200–01
FA Cup runner-up: 2003–04

Republic of Ireland U-20
FIFA World Youth Championship third place: 1997

References

External links
Statistics at soccerbase.com
Photo and stats at sporting-heroes.net
Profile at bristolrovers.co.uk
Profile at nutsandboltsarchive.co.uk (Ashford Town)

Living people
1977 births
Republic of Ireland association footballers
Republic of Ireland under-21 international footballers
Republic of Ireland youth international footballers
Expatriate footballers in England
Irish expatriate sportspeople in England
Republic of Ireland expatriate association footballers
Association football defenders
English Football League players
Belvedere F.C. players
Huddersfield Town A.F.C. players
Millwall F.C. players
Bristol Rovers F.C. players
Welling United F.C. players
Ashford United F.C. players
Fisher Athletic F.C. players
Croydon Athletic F.C. players
Association footballers from County Dublin
FA Cup Final players